This was formed in 1901 as a regiment of the Bengal light Infantry and re designated as 2nd battalion of 39th Garhwal Rifles.

References

British Indian Army infantry regiments
Honourable East India Company regiments
Military units and formations established in 1901
Bengal Presidency